Ti gutter og en gjente (Ten Boys and a Girl) is a Norwegian children's film from 1944 directed by Alexey Zaitzow.

Plot
The film is about ten boys that try to help a street musician collect money for an accordion. The film is considered one of Norway's first children's films.

Cast

 Else Budde as Vivian
 Arol Selmer as Markus, a street musician
 Cecil Aagaard as a firefighter
 Snefrid Aukland as a hoarder
 Øistein Fredstie as Tobben
 Per Hagelsten as Finge'n
 Ole Viktor Hagen as Hans
 Jens Holstad as a music dealer
 Victor Ivarson as Nille's far, a theater director
 Tommie Larsen as Skravla
 Karin Meyer as Markus's mother
 Kåre Næss as Nille
 Tor Oskar Næss as Ola
 Bjørn Pedersen as Knerten
 Stein Rogge as Vorta
 Per Torkildsen as Per
 Knut Tønnesen as Petter, the villain of the street
 Ragnar Østrem as Kjøttkaka

Reception
According to the newspaper Aftenposten, "Norwegian film production's first children's film is thus a reality. It probably does not satisfy the requirements we should set for Norwegian film today, but for the very youngest cinema-goers it is good entertainment."

References

External links
 
 Ti gutter og en gjente at the National Library of Norway
 Ti gutter og en gjente at Filmfront

1944 films
Norwegian children's films
Norwegian drama films
Norwegian black-and-white films
1940s Norwegian-language films